7 Days (previously Seven Days) is an Irish current affairs television programme presented by Brian Farrell, Brian Cleeve and John O'Donoghue which was broadcast on RTÉ One from 1966 until 1976.

History

Background

Seven Days was created by RTÉ One as a replacement for the existing programme Sixty Six.  It was developed at a time when the station was expanding its current affairs programming.  New innovations included having TDs and senators from all parties giving their opinions on Dáil proceedings instead of the political correspondents of the daily newspapers.  Broadcast live on Monday evenings between 8:45pm and 9:15pm, it quickly became RTÉ's flagship current affairs programme.  Seven Days was broadcast for the first time on 26 September 1966.

Presenters

John O'Donoghue, Brian Cleeve and Brian Farrell were the first presenters of Seven Days.  All three had earlier worked on Telefís Éireann's first current affairs programme Broadsheet in the early sixties.

Rebranding

In 1967 the programme was merged with another current affairs programme, Division, and rebranded as 7 Days. As a result of this amalgamation the team of presenters was expanded to include David Thornley, Ted Nealon, Bill O'Herlihy and Paddy Gallagher.

In 1968, it was announced that the current affairs programme, which often tackled subjects of public controversy in a forthright manner, was to be moved to the RTÉ News division. This led to a threatened strike and ultimately to the resignation of several of the programme's presenters.

7 Days was the first home-produced programme to be shown in colour by RTÉ, although colour transmissions of imports predated it.

Tribunal of Inquiry

In December 1969 the Oireachtas voted to establish a tribunal of inquiry regarding a 7 Days piece on money-lenders.  The programme, which was filmed in part with hidden cameras and microphones, claimed that illegal moneylending was causing misery and that the State was not responding to it.  The tribunal's terms of reference were:
 That the allegation of the use of strong-arm methods by unlicensed moneylenders was unfounded
 That the numbers and scale of illegal moneylenders operating in the country were far less than those suggested by the programme
 That the statements made in the programme purporting to be confessions by moneylenders as to strong-arm debt recovery tactics were entirely valueless

The tribunal concluded that the programme content had been exaggerated, although earlier claims that participants had been bribed with alcohol to respond to questions in a certain way were found to be untrue.  Following the tribunal's report, comments critical of the manner of its establishment and the implications of the tribunal's conclusions were made in the Dáil on 25 February 1971 and 9 March 1971 by, among others, Barry Desmond and Garret FitzGerald.

Ending

7 Days was broadcast for the final time in 1976.

References
 Dowling, Jack & Doolan, Lelia. Sit Down and Be Counted: The Cultural Evolution of a Television Station. Wellington Publishers (1969)
 Horgan, John. Broadcasting and Public Life: RTÉ News and Current Affairs 1926-1997. Four Courts Press (2004). 
 
 Dáil motion to create a tribunal of inquiry, 16 December 1969
 Seanad motion to create a tribunal of inquiry, 17 December 1969
 Dáil Éireann - 25 February 1971
 Dáil Éireann - 9 March 1971

Footnotes

External links 
 Clip of 7 Days from 1967 (Windows Media Player). Report on a public meeting about the Irish language, featuring Brian Cleeve and John O'Donoghue.
 Excerpt of 7 Days from 1969 taken from the 1960s section of RTÉ's Libraries and Archives Web Site (RealMedia). Opening credits and John O'Donoghue on personal debt.
 Excerpt from 1971 taken from the 1970s section of the same web site (RealMedia). Opening credits and John O'Donoghue on the first Section 31 directive issued to RTÉ.
 OPEN – One Parent Exchange and Network publication "Do the poor pay more?" PDF document, at page 34
 Conversations with Eamon Dunphy - Bill O'Herlihy, 9 February 2008 MP3 file, beginning at 5 minutes 55 seconds.

1960s Irish television series
1970s Irish television series
1966 Irish television series debuts
1976 Irish television series endings
Irish television news shows
RTÉ News and Current Affairs
RTÉ original programming